The Hot Docs Audience Awards are annual film awards, presented by the Hot Docs Canadian International Documentary Festival to the most popular films as voted by festival audiences. There are currently two awards presented: the Hot Docs Audience Award, presented since 2001 to the most popular film overall regardless of nationality, and the Rogers Audience Award, presented since 2017 to the most popular Canadian film. If a Canadian film wins the overall award, then the Canadian award is not given to a different film in lieu, but instead the same film wins both awards. 

Due to the COVID-19 pandemic in Canada, in both 2020 and 2021 the festival opted to split the Canadian award and its associated prize money among all of the five highest-ranked Canadian films of the year instead of singling out only the top-ranked Canadian film. In 2022, the festival split the Canadian award among three films instead of five.

Hot Docs Audience Award

Rogers Audience Award

See also
Toronto International Film Festival People's Choice Award: Documentaries

References

Canadian documentary film awards